A 2-8-8-4 steam locomotive, under the Whyte notation, has two leading wheels, two sets of eight driving wheels, and a four-wheel trailing truck. The type was generally named the Yellowstone, a name given it by the first owner, the Northern Pacific Railway, whose lines ran near Yellowstone National Park. Seventy-two Yellowstone-type locomotives were built for four U.S. railroads.

Other equivalent classifications are:
UIC classification: 1DD2 (also known as German classification and Italian classification)
French classification: 140+042
Turkish classification: 45+46
Swiss classification: 4/5+4/6
Russian classification: 1-4-0+0-4-2

The equivalent UIC classification is, refined for Mallet locomotives, (1′D)D2′.

A locomotive of this length must be an articulated locomotive.

Several classes of Yellowstone, especially the Duluth, Missabe and Iron Range's locomotives, are among the largest steam locomotives, with the exact ranking depending on the criteria used.

Northern Pacific
The Northern Pacific Railway was the first railroad to order a 2-8-8-4. The first was built in 1928 by American Locomotive Company; at the time, it was the largest locomotive ever built. But the firebed was too large for the available draft and the fire burned poorly and developed under 5,000 horsepower. The problem was mitigated by blocking off the first few feet of the grates. Baldwin Locomotive Works built 11 more for the Northern Pacific in 1930. No examples have been preserved.

Southern Pacific
The Southern Pacific Railroad's famous "cab forward" articulated steam locomotives were effectively a Yellowstone in reverse. This was done to spare the crew from the heavy smoke output of the large engines on the former Central Pacific, where tunnels and snow sheds were common and lengthy. One is on display at the California State Railroad Museum in Sacramento. The ready availability of fuel oil in California made them possible. The SP also owned some conventional 2-8-8-4s for use in areas where coal was plentiful and snow sheds were rare. Lima Locomotive Works built 12 AC-9 class locomotives in 1939; they had skyline casings with striped pilots. At first, they burned coal but were later converted to oil. None were saved.

Duluth, Missabe and Iron Range

The Duluth, Missabe and Iron Range Railway hauled iron ore in Minnesota. Iron ore is heavy and the DM&IR operated long trains of ore cars, requiring maximum power. These locomotives were based upon ten 2-8-8-2s that Baldwin had built in the 1930s for the Western Pacific Railroad. The need for a larger, coal-burning firebox and a longer, all-weather cab led to the use of a four-wheel trailing truck, giving them the "Yellowstone" wheel arrangement. They were the most powerful Yellowstones built, producing  of tractive effort, and had the most weight on drivers so that they were less prone to slipping.

Eight locomotives (class M-3) were built by Baldwin in 1941. The Yellowstones met or exceeded the DM&IR specifications, so 10 more were ordered (class M-4). The second batch was completed in late 1943 after the Missabe's seasonal downturn in ore traffic, so some of the new M-4s were leased to and delivered directly to the Denver and Rio Grande Western Railroad.

The next winter, the D&RGW again leased the DM&IR's Yellowstones as helpers over Tennessee Pass, Colorado, and for other freight duties. The Rio Grande returned the Yellowstones after air-brake failure caused No. 224 to wreck on the Fireclay Loop. This was despite the Rio Grande's earlier assessment that these Yellowstones were the finest engines ever to operate there.

DM&IRs were the only Yellowstones to have a high-capacity pedestal or centipede tender, and had roller bearings on all axles. Some of the locomotives had a cylindrical Elesco feedwater heater ahead of the smoke stack, while others had a Worthington unit with its rectangular box in the same location.

Only one Yellowstone was retired before dieselization took place on the Missabe; No. 237 was sold for scrap after a wreck. The rest of the 2-8-8-4s were retired between 1958 and 1963 as diesel locomotives took over.

Of the eighteen built, three survive and are on display in Minnesota: No. 225 at Proctor, No. 227 at the Lake Superior Railroad Museum in Duluth and No. 229 at Two Harbors.

Baltimore and Ohio

When the U.S. entered World War II The American railroads saw increases in traffic. The Baltimore and Ohio Railroad, along with other railroads, wanted to purchase more of the diesel locomotives since they were showing improved performance over steam locomotives. But the War Production Board regulated the production of steam and diesel locomotives until the war emergency was over. So, along with producing 40 new class T-3 4-8-2 type locomotives built in-house at its Mt. Clare shops in Baltimore, Maryland, the B&O took delivery of 30 class EM-1 Yellowstones in 1944 and 1945, the largest number and the smallest of this type built by Baldwin as well as the most modern.

The EM-1 produced  of tractive effort on  drivers with  steam pressure and four  cylinders. The tender carried  of water and 25 tons of coal. Nothing bigger could operate within the tunnel clearances and track restrictions on the B&O's main line.

They were equipped with the newest technology, including the Worthington feedwater heater, superheater with front-end throttle, Cyclone front end, thermic syphons, a lateral cushioning device in the front pair of drivers on both engines and the front wheels and the trailing truck, as well as roller bearings on all axles, engine and tender, which gave them the reputation of "yard creepers", because three men could move one on a level track with the cylinder cocks open.

B&O's president, Roy B. White, after inspecting the first one delivered, said to the general superintendent of motive power and equipment, A.K. Galloway, "Well, I must say, they have everything!"

Fleet numbers 7600–7619 were built and delivered in 1944 and 7620–7629 in 1945, all by the Baldwin Locomotive Works of Philadelphia, Pennsylvania. They went to work on the Cumberland Division's rugged West End subdivision with its more than 2% grades and tight curves, where with the older 2-8-8-0 EL classes, they hauled West Virginia coal and freights. Since the EM-1s had roller bearings throughout, they also handled mail and express trains, replacing two B&O class T-3 4-8-2 Mountains. That continued until January 21, 1947, when, near Oakland, Maryland, train 29 with engine 7625 derailed with the locomotive rolling onto the engineer's side, killing the engineer. The EM-1s were then restricted to coal and freight trains until the late 1950s, when the B&O used EM-1 No. 7600 for railfan trips.

The EM-1s also ran on the Pittsburgh Division over Sand Patch Grade near Meyersdale, Pennsylvania, with empty hoppers, iron ore or dolomite loads westbound, coal eastbound, as well as general freight in both directions. In the late 1950s, the B&O used EM-1 No. 7600 for railfan trips mostly between Cumberland, MD, and Connellsville, PA. Well-known photographer and Cumberland, MD native William P. Price captured, on still pictures and 8mm films, the EM-1s on the east side of Sand Patch pulling heavy trains with two of the B&O's 2-10-2 class S1 and S1a Big Sixes on the rear as helpers dispatched from Hyndman, PA. 
 
Near the end of steam they were all sent out to Fairmont and Wheeling, West Virginia, and Lorain, Ohio, with lake-bound coal trains as well as runs between Willard, OH and Garrett, Indiana, until the B&O started to retire them in 1957, and all of them were scrapped. But one locomotive, No. 659, almost made it to preservation. The B&O Railroad Museum in Baltimore selected this locomotive as one of its future museum exhibits. However, there was a mix-up in communication regarding the locomotive's status, and the salvage crew scrapped No. 659 where it stood. Thus, none of the EM-1s survive today.

Outside the United States

The metre-gauge Central Railway of Brazil took delivery of four 2-8-8-4s from the German firm of Henschel in 1937. They were the only narrow gauge locomotives of this wheel arrangement. They had the largest boilers ever used on a narrow-gauge simple expansion locomotive.

Soviet Russia constructed two 2-8-8-4 locomotives at the Kolomna Locomotive Works. These were the P38 Class numbers P38.001 and P38.002. The first locomotive carried partial casings over the boiler and smokebox typical of the 1950s. P38.002 bore no such adornments and had a more conventional appearance. Both engines had tenders with part bogie and part fixed frame similar to the American 'centipede' tenders.

Notes

External links
 Web Site of ToyTrains1 2-8-8-4 Yellowstone Steam Locomotives
 "Is This Monster Locomotive a HE or SHE?" Popular Mechanics Monthly, July 1930

 
88,2-8-8-4